Radio 1's Live Lounge – Volume 5 is a collection of live tracks played on Fearne Cotton's and Jo Whiley's Radio 1 shows. The album is the fifth in a series of Live Lounge albums. It consists of both covers and the bands' own songs. The album was released on 25 October 2010.

Track listing

See also
Live Lounge
Radio 1's Live Lounge
Radio 1's Live Lounge – Volume 2
Radio 1's Live Lounge – Volume 3
Radio 1's Live Lounge – Volume 4
Radio 1: Established 1967
List of Live Lounge cover versions

References

External links
Radio 1's Live Lounge – Volume 5 on Myspace

Live Lounge
2010 compilation albums
Covers albums
2010 live albums